Burman is a surname. Notable people with the surname include:

Anneli Burman (born 1963), Swedish curler
Barney Burman, American make-up artist 
Barry Burman (1943–2001), English figurative artist
Ben Lucien Burman (1896–1984), American author and journalist
Bob Burman (1884–1916), American racecar driver
Carina Burman (born 1960), Swedish novelist and literature scholar
Daniel Burman (born 1973), Argentinian filmmaker
Erica Burman (born 1960), British developmental psychologist
Fale Burman (1903–1973), Swedish Army lieutenant general 
Jayasri Burman (born 1960), Indian artist, niece of Sakti
Johannes Burman (1707–1780), Dutch botanist and physician
John Burman (born 1982) American coffee mogul
Karl Burman (1882–1965), Estonian architect and painter
Maya Burman (born 1971), French artist, daughter of Sakti
Nicolaas Laurens Burman (1734–1793), Dutch botanist, son of Johannes
Pieter Burman the Elder (1668–1741), Dutch classical scholar
Pieter Burman the Younger (1713–1778), Dutch classical scholar, nephew of previous
Rahul Dev Burman (1939–1994), Indian Bollywood music composer, son of SD
Sachin Dev Burman (1906–1975), Indian Bollywood music composer
Saket Burman (born 1976/77), British billionaire
Sakti Burman (born 1935), Indian artist based in France
Shirley Burman (born 1934), American railroad photographer and historian
Tony Burman (born 1948), Canadian journalist and editor in chief of CBC News
William Francis Burman (1897–1974), First World War English recipient of the Victoria Cross

See also
Barman (surname)
Burmann, surname
Buurman, surname
Burman and Sons Ltd, UK manufacturer of automotive steering gear
Bamar, dominant ethnic group of Burma, sometimes called Burman
Tibeto-Burman languages, linguistic subfamily of the proposed Sino-Tibetan language family
Variant of the Indian title and surname Varma
Berman